Liopinus imitans is a species of beetle in the family Cerambycidae. It was described by Knull in 1936.

References

Acanthocinini
Beetles described in 1936